Digvijay Singh may refer to:

Digvijaya Singh (born 1947), Indian politician, Former CM of Madhya Pradesh
Digvijay Singh (Bihar politician) (1955–2010), Indian politician from Banka area of Bihar 
Digvijay Singh (Rajasthan politician), Minister of Agriculture of Rajasthan
Digvijay Singh (golfer) (born 1972), Indian golfer
K. D. Singh (Kunwar Digwijay Singh, 1922–1978), Indian field hockey player
Digvijay Narain Singh (1924–1991), Indian politician from Muzaffarpur area of Bihar
Digvijaysinhji Ranjitsinhji (1895-1966), Maharaja Jam Sahib of Nawanagar 1933-1948
Digvijay Singh Rao Bhonsale (born 1989), Indian Rock and Metal vocalist, guitarist and songwriter